The New Reality is a Canadian television newsmagazine series, which premiered on Global in 2020. The network's return to dedicated newsmagazine programming following the cancellation of 16×9 in 2016, the series features long-form investigative and documentary reports. Dawna Friesen, the network's chief anchor on Global National, hosts the program; unlike some newsmagazine series, however, The New Reality does not have its own dedicated staff, but airs work by all of the Global News team.

The series received a Canadian Screen Award nomination for Best News or Information Segment at the 10th Canadian Screen Awards in 2021, for Mike Armstrong's report "Betty's Story".

References

2020 Canadian television series debuts
2020s Canadian television news shows
2020s Canadian documentary television series
Global Television Network original programming